Doris (Ancient Greek: Δωρίς/Δωρίδος means 'bounty'), in Greek mythology, was a sea goddess. She was one of the 3,000 Oceanids, daughters of the Titans Oceanus and Tethys.

Etymology
Her name is connected with two words: Dôron meaning  "gift" or "abundance," and Zôros, meaning the "pure" and "unmixed." Zôros was often used to describe fresh water or, in terms of the teachings of the day, the pure soul of a woman, and from this derived words such as zôrua "the transference of running water" and zôrux "water conduit."

Function 
When not associated with a god, Doris represented the fertility of the ocean, goddess of the rich fishing-grounds found at the mouths of rivers where fresh water mingled with the brine. Being an Oceanid meant she was a sister of the river gods.

Family 
By her husband Nereus, Doris was mother to Nerites and the fifty Nereids, including Thetis, Amphitrite and Galatea.

Namesake
Doris Cove in Antarctica is named after the goddess.

See also 
 48 Doris

Notes

References 

 Apollodorus, The Library with an English Translation by Sir James George Frazer, F.B.A., F.R.S. in 2 Volumes, Cambridge, MA, Harvard University Press; London, William Heinemann Ltd. 1921. . Online version at the Perseus Digital Library. Greek text available from the same website.
Claudius Aelianus, On the Characteristics of Animals, translated by Alwyn Faber Scholfield (1884-1969), from Aelian, Characteristics of Animals, published in three volumes by Harvard/Heinemann, Loeb Classical Library, 1958. Online version at the Topos Text Project.
 Claudius Aelianus, De Natura Animalium, Latin translation by Friedrich Jacobs in the Frommann edition, Jena, 1832. Latin translation available at Bill Thayer's Web Site
 Claudius Aelianus, De Natura Animalium, Rudolf Hercher. Lipsiae, in aedibus B. G. Teubneri, 1864.  Greek text available at the Perseus Digital Library.
 Gaius Julius Hyginus, Fabulae from The Myths of Hyginus translated and edited by Mary Grant. University of Kansas Publications in Humanistic Studies. Online version at the Topos Text Project.
 Hesiod, Theogony from The Homeric Hymns and Homerica with an English Translation by Hugh G. Evelyn-White, Cambridge, MA.,Harvard University Press; London, William Heinemann Ltd. 1914. Online version at the Perseus Digital Library. Greek text available from the same website.
 Kerényi, Carl, The Gods of the Greeks, Thames and Hudson, London, 1951.
Publius Ovidius Naso, Metamorphoses translated by Brookes More (1859-1942). Boston, Cornhill Publishing Co. 1922. Online version at the Perseus Digital Library.
 Publius Ovidius Naso, Metamorphoses. Hugo Magnus. Gotha (Germany). Friedr. Andr. Perthes. 1892. Latin text available at the Perseus Digital Library.

External links 
 

Oceanids
Greek goddesses